Johan Ramhorn (born 3 May 1996) is a Swedish footballer who most recently played for Kalmar FF as a defender.

His twin brother, Sebastian, also played for Kalmar FF and they have followed each other much throughout their careers.

Honours
Sweden U17
 FIFA U-17 World Cup Third place: 2013

References

External links

Johan Ramhorn at Fotbolltransfers.com

1996 births
Association football defenders
Swedish footballers
Kalmar FF players
GAIS players
Åtvidabergs FF players
Allsvenskan players
Superettan players
Sweden youth international footballers
Swedish people of South Korean descent
Twin sportspeople
Swedish twins
Living people